2 Persei is a binary star system in the northern constellation Perseus, located around 500 light years away from the Sun. It is visible to the naked eye as a faint, blue-white hued star with an apparent visual magnitude is 5.70. The system is moving further away from the Earth with a heliocentric radial velocity of 11 km/s.

In 1970 radial velocity measurements from spectrograms taken at David Dunlap Observatory indicated it was a single-lined spectroscopic binary. Follow up observations led to the determination that it had a nearly circular orbit with a period of 5.6 days. The visible component is a chemically peculiar mercury-manganese star with a stellar classification of B9pHgMn.  Other analyses of its spectrum have assigned it the giant star spectral type of B9III.

References

B-type giants
Mercury-manganese stars
Spectroscopic binaries
Perseus (constellation)
Durchmusterung objects
Persei, 02
011291
008714
0536